This page lists board and card games, wargames, miniatures games, and tabletop role-playing games published in 2007.  For video games, see 2007 in video gaming.

Games released or invented in 2007

Game awards given in 2007
Spiel des Jahres: Zooloretto
Games: Pillars of the Earth
 Brass won the Spiel Portugal Jogo do Ano.

Significant games-related events in 2007
An article in Science announces that Checkers (Draughts) is a solved game.  With perfect play by both sides, the game ends in a draw.

Deaths

See also
List of game manufacturers
2007 in video gaming

Games
Games by year

References